The Voueize is a  river in the Creuse département, central France. Its source is at La Chaussade. It flows generally northeast. It is a left tributary of the Tardes into which it flows at Chambon-sur-Voueize.

Communes along its course
This list is ordered from source to mouth: La Chaussade, Bosroger, Champagnat, Puy-Malsignat, Peyrat-la-Nonière, Saint-Julien-le-Châtel, Saint-Loup, Pierrefitte, Gouzon, Bord-Saint-Georges, Lussat, Lépaud, Chambon-sur-Voueize

References

Rivers of France
Rivers of Creuse
Rivers of Nouvelle-Aquitaine